Hunkeler is a surname. Notable people with the surname include:

Edith Hunkeler (born 1972), Swiss former wheelchair racer
Edward Joseph Hunkeler (1894–1970), American prelate of the Roman Catholic Church
Ida Glanzmann-Hunkeler (born 1958), Swiss politician and current Vice President of the Christian Democratic People's Party
Ruth Hunkeler (born 1940), Swiss equestrian
Tamara Hunkeler, Swiss DJ

See also 
Hunkeler: Das Paar im Kahn, is a Swiss German language television film
Hunkeler macht Sachen, is a Swiss German language television film
Hunkeler und die Augen des Ödipus, is a Swiss German language television film